Strike Reconnaissance Group was a Royal Australian Air Force group responsible for operating the RAAF's F-111 aircraft. On 1 January 2002 it was combined with Tactical Fighter Group to form Air Combat Group.

RAAF groups